The Ferrovieri Engineer Regiment  is a military engineer regiment of the Italian Army based in Castel Maggiore in the Emilia Romagna. Today the regiment is assigned to the army's Engineer Command and is NATO's only unit capable of railway construction and operation. The term "Ferrovieri" comes from the Italian word for railway and is used to denote units of the engineer arm tasked with the construction, restoration, maintenance, and operation of railways. Enlisted personnel in such units are addressed by the singular form: "Ferroviere".

In 1873 the first Italian Ferrovieri companies were formed, which were tasked with the construction and repair of rwailways. In 1891 the first railway operations companies were formed. In 1910 the Ferrovieri units were formed into the 6th Engineer Regiment (Ferrovieri). During World War I the regiment's depots formed numerous small units, which built and operated railways on the Italian front. In 1919 the regiment was renamed Ferrovieri Engineer Regiment. In World War II the regiment formed ten railway and three bridging battalions, as well as three railway operation groups. One of the railway battalions served in the Western Desert Campaign and Tunisian Campaign, while two operated with the Italian Army in Russia during the Italian Campaign on the Eastern Front. After the announcement of the Armistice of Cassibile on 8 September 1943 the regiment was disbanded by invading German forces, while the Ferrovieri units in Southern Italy joined the Italian Co-Belligerent Army. These units repaired and operated railway lines that supported the advance of the allies armies during the Italian campaign. In 1957 the regiment was reformed with a railway and an operations battalion. In 2017 the two battalions were merged into one single unit.

History

Formation 
The first use of railways for military purposes in Italy occurred in 1859 during the Second Italian War of Independence, when personnel of the 1st Engineer Regiment was trained to operate trains to transport French and Sardinian troops.

The law of 30 September 1873 determined that the Royal Sardinian Army's Sappers Corps should be split into two regiments and that for each regiment two Ferrovieri companies should be raised. The four companies were raised and based in Turin, where they formed the Ferrovieri Brigade. On 1 November 1883 the Ferrovieri Brigade was assigned to the newly formed 3rd Engineer Regiment. On 23 June 1887 the 3rd Engineer Regiment transferred the Ferrovieri Brigade to the 4th Engineer Regiment.

In 1891 the brigade took over the operation of the Torino-Torre Pellice/Barge railway, which resulted led to a reorganization of the Ferrovieri Brigade: the 1st and 3rd companies were organized as railway operations companies, while the 2nd and 4th companies were organized as construction companies. On 1 July 1895 the brigade became an autonomous unit and grew to six companies: 1st and 3rd operations, and 2nd, 4th, 5th, and 6th construction companies. The six companies were group into two Ferrovieri groups. In 1903 the I Ferrovieri Group, with the 1st (Operations) and 2nd (Construction) companies, moved to Rome. Between September 1907 and September 1910 the group operated the Rome–Frascati railway.

In October 1910 the brigade was renamed 6th Engineer Regiment (Ferrovieri) and consisted now of a staff, a Ferrovieri battalion with four companies in Turin, a Ferrovieri battalion with two companies in Rome, a motorists battalion with two companies in Turin, railway operations section in Turin operating the Turin-Pinerolo railway, a depot in Turin, and a branch depot in Rome. One of the companies assigned to the new regiment had distinguished itself as 6th Sappers Company of the 2nd Engineer Regiment during Battle of Macerone Pass on 20 October 1860 during the Second Italian War of Independence and arrived with a Bronze Medal of Military Valour. This company became the regiment's senior company and was therefore numbered 1st Company, while the company's medal was affixed to the regiment's flag.

In 1912 the motorists companies became responsible for the photo-electrical service, which employed searchlights. In December 1913 the depot in Rome formed the Special Photo-Electrical Section to train artillery personnel in the use of searchlights. In 1914 the section was transferred to the Artillery Arm's newly formed Artillery Specialists Group.

World War I 
During World War I battalions and companies raised by the regiment operated in all sectors of the Italian front. In total the regiment's two depots formed three Ferrovieri battalions and 16 Ferrovieri companies, nine decauville operations companies, seven photo-electricians battalions and 36 photo-electricians companies, and 26 territorial photo-electricians sections which operated more than 1,200 searchlight stations. During the war the Ferrovieri built  of railway,  of decauville trench railways and repaired 144 bridges. 

On 21 November 1919 the regiment was renamed Ferrovieri Engineer Regiment and consisted of command, the I Ferrovieri Battalion in Turin with four companies, the II Ferrovieri Battalion with two companies in Treviso, a railway operations section in Turin, a depot in Turin, and a branch depot in Treviso. The Railway Operations Section operated the Chivasso–Aosta railway since 1915. In April 1920 photo-electricians units were assigned to newly formed army corps telegraphers battalions.

In November 1921 the 2nd Railway Operations Section was formed in Meran to operate the Bolzano-Meran-Mals railway. In 1923 the two sections were united in the Operations Group. On 11 March 1926 the regiment was renamed Ferrovieri Regiment. On 25 April 1932 the 2nd Railway Operations Section was disbanded and the regiment now only operated the Chivasso–Aosta railway.

For the Second Italo-Ethiopian War in 1935-36 the regiment formed in 1935 the following units:
 30th and 31st Ferrovieri companies
 one railway operations section
 one special Ferrovieri section
 one mechanics/electricians company

On 1 October 1938 the regiment received the Dismountable Metal Bridges Company from the from the 2nd Pontieri Regiment.

World War II 
With the outbreak of World War II the regiment's two depots began to mobilize new units:

 Command of the 1st Ferrovieri Regiment
 I, II, III, IV, V, VI, VII, VIII, X, and XIII Ferrovieri battalions
 IX, XI, and XII dismountable metal bridges battalions
 I, II, and III railway operations groups (each with five sections)
 a bath train
 and numerous smaller Ferrovieri construction and operating units

On 9 July 1943, the day the Allied invasion of Sicily began, the Italian Army's General Staff ordered that all Ferrovieri units, with the exception of those in Italian occupied France, Italian occupied Greece, Corsica and Sardinia, where to enter four Ferrovieri groupings on 15 July 1943:

 1st Ferrovieri Grouping: I, VII, and VIII Ferrovieri battalions
 2nd Ferrovieri Grouping: III, VI, and XIII Ferrovieri battalions, and III Railway Operations Group
 3rd Ferrovieri Grouping: IV and X Ferrovieri battalions, and II Railway Operations Group
 4th Ferrovieri Grouping: V and IX Ferrovieri battalions, and I Railway Operations Group

The VII Ferrovieri Battalion served in the Western Desert Campaign and Tunisian Campaign. The IX and X Ferrovieri battalions served on the Eastern Front, where the X Ferrovieri Battalion fought in the Battle of Arbuzovka as frontline infantry, earning the battalion a War Cross of Military Valour. In 1941 the 9th Company of the IV Ferrovieri Battalion built a combined road and rail bridge over the Corinth Canal, using an Austrian Roth-Waagner-Brückengerät. The same battalion repaired the bridge over the Gorgopotamos river after the British-Greek Operation Harling had successfully destroyed the bridge on 25 November 1942. Another bridge repaired by the regiment's troops was the Stampetta Bridge in Slovenia. The III and VI Ferrovieri battalions served during the campaign in Sicily.

The Ferrovieri Regiment was disbanded by invading German forces after the announcement of the Armistice of Cassibile on 8 September 1943.

The Ferrovieri units stationed in Southern Italy were unaffected by the German invasion of Italy and soon joined the Italian Co-Belligerent Army. These Ferrovieri units repaired and operated railway lines, which transported supplies and materiel for the allied armies that were fighting their way up the Italian peninsula during the Italian campaign. Initially this Ferrovieri Grouping consisted of the I and XIII Ferrovieri battalions, which were later joined by the II, III, and VI Ferrovieri battalions. The Ferrovieri repaired and at times also operated the Naples-Reggio Calabria, Naples-Caserta, Naples-Rome, Rome-Pisa, Rome-Florence, Bari-Ancona-Bologna, and Bologna-Verona railways. The grouping was disbanded on 1 November 1945 and only two dismountable metal bridges companies remained active. In 1947 the two companies were formed into a Ferrovieri battalion based in Castel Maggiore. The two companies built 23 bridges after the war and dismantled 13, which had been partially destroyed.

Cold War 
In 1949 the a Railway Operations Section was reformed in Turin, which once again took over operation of the Chivasso–Aosta railway. The section was quickly expanded to company. On 15 December 1949 the Ferrovieri Battalion and the Railway Operations Company were assigned to reformed 2nd Pontieri Engineer Regiment. On 1 January 1954 the Ferrovieri Battalion became an autonomous unit, which on 1 October 1957 was expanded to Ferrovieri Engineer Regiment. On the same date the II Pontieri Engineer Battalion in Legnano and the Railway Operations Company in Turin were transferred from the 2nd Pontieri Engineer Regiment to the Ferrovieri Engineer Regiment. The regiment was assigned to the Tuscan-Emilian Military Region and consisted now of a command, a command company, the I Ferrovieri Battalion, the II Pontieri Engineer Battalion, the Railway Operations Company, and the 3rd Dismountable Metal Bridges Company. On 1 January 1962 the regiment received the VI Army Corps Engineer Battalion. In 1963 the 3rd Dismountable Metal Bridges Company was disbanded. On 1 February 1964 the II Pontieri Engineer Battalion was reassigned to the 2nd Pontieri Engineer Regiment. On 1 July 1965 the Railway Operations Company was expanded to the Railway Operations Battalion.

As part of the 1975 Italian Army reform the VI Army Corps Engineer Battalion was disbanded on 31 October 1975. After the reform the regiment was assigned to the Engineering Inspectorate and its organization was as follows:

  Ferrovieri Engineer Regiment, in Castel Maggiore
 Command and Services Platoon, in Castel Maggiore
 I Ferrovieri Battalion (Dismountable Metal Bridges), in Castel Maggiore
 II Ferrovieri Battalion (Operations), in Turin

On 8 October 1977 flood waters of the Toce river swept the railway bridge of the Domodossola–Milan railway between Fondotoce and Feriolo away and the Ferrovieri Engineer Regiment was called up to rebuild the  bridge. On 27 May 1978 the new bridge was opened and traffic between Milan and the Simplon Railway could resume. For its work the regiment was awarded a Bronze Cross of Army Merit.

Recent times 
On 16 July 1992 the Command and Services Platoon was expanded to Command and Services Company. For its service in Bosnia-Herzegovina the regiment was awarded a Silver Medal of Army Valour. On 1 December 1997 the regiment passed from the Tuscan-Emilian Military Region to the army's Engineer Grouping, which on 10 September 2010 became the Engineer Command.

In July 1999 after the Kosovo War the regiment was deployed to Kosovo, where the regiment operated the Skopje–Kosovo Polje–Pristina railway, and repaired/operated the Kosovo Polje–Peć and Klina–Prizren railways. The regiment returned to Italy in December 1999. For its service in Kosovo the regiment was awarded a Gold Cross of Army Merit.

In 2001 the regiment ceded the operation of the Chivasso–Ivrea–Aosta railway to the Ferrovie dello Stato and on 1 February 2002 the regiment formed the Operations Battalion in Ozzano Emilia, which received some of the personnel and materiel of the 2nd Ferrovieri Battalion (Operations) in Turin, before the latter disbanded on 31 August of the same year and reformed as 32nd Engineer Battalion the next day. The new Operations Battalion was disbanded on 31 October 2017 and its functions and personnel merged into the 1st Ferrovieri Battalion.

Current structure 

As of 2022 the Ferrovieri Engineer Regiment consists of:

  Regimental Command, in Castel Maggiore
 Command and Logistic Support Company
 Ferrovieri Engineer Battalion
 Rail Operations Company
 Railway Equipment and Bridges Company
 Special Equipment and Construction Company
 Road- and Earthworks Company

The Command and Logistic Support Company fields the following platoons: C3 Platoon, Transport and Materiel Platoon, Medical Platoon, Commissariat Platoon, and EOD Platoon. The regiment possess its own diesel locomotives, rolling stock and railway construction cars.

External links
Italian Army Website: Reggimento Genio Ferrovieri

References

Engineer Regiments of Italy
Rail transport in Italy